Szczytniki nad Kaczawą  is a village in the administrative district of Gmina Kunice, within Legnica County, Lower Silesian Voivodeship, in south-western Poland. Prior to 1945 it was in Germany and called Pohlschildern.

References

Villages in Legnica County